Cass County is a county in the U.S. state of Michigan. As of the 2020 Census, the population was 51,589. Its county seat is Cassopolis.

Cass County is included in the South Bend–Mishawaka, IN-MI, Metropolitan Statistical Area which has a total population of 316,663 and is considered part of the Michiana region.

History
The county is named for Lewis Cass, the Michigan Territorial Governor at the time the county was created in 1829. Cass later served as the United States Secretary of War under President Andrew Jackson, thus making a case for including Cass County as one of Michigan's "cabinet counties".

Cass County was not as heavily forested and had more fertile prairie land than other nearby areas of Michigan. During early settlement, it attracted numerous settlers who wanted to farm and grew more rapidly in population.

The county quickly developed industry as well. As early as 1830, a carding mill was started in the county on Dowagiac Creek, a branch of the St. Joseph River. Although the Sauk Trail (Chicago Road) passed through the southern part of the county, early settlement did not come primarily from eastern Michigan.  Instead, settlers from Ohio and Indiana migrated who had learned of available prairie lands, reaching the Michigan Territory via a branch of the Chicago Road leading from Fort Wayne, Indiana. The population of Cass County was more than 3,000 by 1834.

Among the most prominent early settlers of Cass County were Baldwin Jenkins and Uzziel Putnam, who both came from Ohio by way of the Carey Mission in Berrien County.  Jenkins had been born at Fort Jenkins in Green County, Pennsylvania, and had migrated to Tennessee. He left that state as he was opposed to the institution of slavery. Putnam, who had lived in Massachusetts and New York, migrated to Cass from Erie County, Ohio, by way of Fort Wayne.  These settlers, and their families, established the nucleus of the village of Pokagon on Pokagon Prairie in 1825. The next year, a settlement was made on Beardsley's Prairie, where the village of Edwardsburg was laid out in 1831.

The village of Cassopolis was platted in 1831 and intended as the county seat, because it was the geographical center of the county. It had no settlers at the time.

Black settlers
After 1840, the black population of Cass County grew rapidly as families were attracted by white defiance of discriminatory laws, including the Fugitive Slave Law. Numerous highly supportive Quakers helped blacks settle in the area, and the land was low-priced. Free and refugee blacks found Cass County to be a haven. Their development of a thriving community attracted the attention of southern slaveholders.

In 1847 and 1849, planters from Bourbon and Boone counties in northern Kentucky led raids into Cass County to recapture escaped slaves. They were "surrounded by crowds of angry farmers armed with clubs, scythes, and other farm implements", resisting their attempt.

The raids failed to accomplish their objective but strengthened Southern demands for passage of the Fugitive Slave Act of 1850, which required residents and law enforcement even in free states to support capture of refugee slaves, and increased penalties for failure to do so. Biased toward slaveholders and slavecatchers, it required little documentation and put free blacks at risk for capture and sale into slavery. Many in the North resisted the law, especially in abolitionist strongholds, and it increased tensions contributing to the Civil War.

Cass County became known early on for the anti-slavery attitudes of its population. Pennsylvania Quakers made a settlement in Penn Township in 1829. This community later became a prominent station on the Underground Railroad. One established Underground Railroad route ran from Niles through Cassopolis, Schoolcraft, Climax, and Battle Creek, and thence along the old Territorial Road.

Historical markers

Some 26 historical sites in Cass County have been listed on the National Register of Historic Places and designated by state historical markers as of December 2009.

Geography

It is the smallest county in Michigan by total area.

Major highways

Adjacent counties
 Van Buren County (north)
 St. Joseph County (east)
 Berrien County (west)
 Elkhart County, Indiana (southeast)
 St. Joseph County, Indiana (southwest)

Government

The county government operates the jail, maintains rural roads, operates the major local courts, keeps files of deeds and mortgages, maintains vital records, administers public health regulations, and participates with the state in the provision of welfare and other social services. The elected county board of commissioners controls the budget but has only limited authority to make laws or ordinances.

In Michigan, most local government functions — police and fire, building and zoning, tax assessment, street maintenance, etc. — are the responsibility of individual cities and townships.

Elected officials
 Prosecuting Attorney: Victor Fitz
 Sheriff: Richard J. Behnke
 County Clerk/Register of Deeds: Monica McMichael
 County Treasurer: Hope Anderson
 Drain Commissioner: Bruce A. Campbell

(information as of July 2019)

Demographics

As of the 2010 United States Census, there were 52,293 people living in the county. 88.9% were White, 5.4% Black or African American, 1.0% Native American, 0.6% Asian, 1.1% of some other race and 3.0% of two or more races. 3.0% were Hispanic or Latino (of any race). 25.9% were of German, 10.0% English, 9.6% Irish, 8.1% American and 5.7% Polish ancestry.

As of the 2000 census, there were 51,104 people, 19,676 households, and 14,304 families living in the county. There were 23,884 housing units at an average density of 48 per square mile (19/km2). The racial makeup of the county was 89.19% White, 6.12% Black or African American, 0.82% Native American, 0.54% Asian, 0.01% Pacific Islander, 1.17% from other races, and 2.15% from two or more races.  2.41% of the population were Hispanic or Latino of any race. 26.6% were of German, 11.1% American, 10.3% Irish, 10.1% English and 5.0% Polish ancestry, 96.4% spoke English and 2.0% Spanish as their first language.

There were 19,676 households, out of which 31.00% had children under the age of 18 living with them, 58.20% were married couples living together, 9.90% had a female householder with no husband present, and 27.30% were not family units. 22.60% of all households were made up of individuals, and 9.40% had someone living alone who was 65 years of age or older.  The average household size was 2.56 and the average family size was 2.98.

In the county, the population was spread out, with 25.50% under the age of 18, 7.40% from 18 to 24, 27.60% from 25 to 44, 26.00% from 45 to 64, and 13.60% who were 65 years of age or older.  The median age was 38 years. For every 100 females, there were 99.90 males.  For every 100 females age 18 and over, there were 97.40 males.

The median income for a household in the county was $41,264, and the median income for a family was $46,901. Males had a median income of $35,546 versus $24,526 for females. The per capita income for the county was $19,474.  About 6.80% of families and 9.90% of the population were below the poverty line, including 13.60% of those under age 18 and 8.80% of those age 65 or over.

Education

Higher Education
Cass County is home to Southwestern Michigan College. The college is a public two-year institution of higher education, the college is part of the Michigan community college system. The college is the largest employer in Cass County.

Libraries
Cass County has several library system which operate in the county. The Cass District Library is the largest library in the county, have branch located in 4 cities around the county. Cass District Library is the library system which services Calvin, Howard, Jefferson, LaGrange, Mason, Milton, Newberg, Ontwa, Penn, Pokagon, Porter and Volinia Townships.

The Dowagiac District Library serves the City of Dowagiac, Wayne Township, and portions of Silver Creek, Keeler, and Bainbridge townships. Marcellus Township also operates their own library apart from the Cass District library to service the residence of the village of Marcellus and the Township of Marcellus.

Southwestern Michigan College operates the Fred Mathews Library on its Campus in Dowagiac.

Communities

Cities
 Dowagiac
 Niles (part)

Villages
 Cassopolis (county seat)
 Edwardsburg
 Marcellus
 Vandalia

Civil townships

 Calvin Township
 Howard Township
 Jefferson Township
 LaGrange Township
 Marcellus Township
 Mason Township
 Milton Township
 Newberg Township
 Ontwa Township
 Penn Township
 Pokagon Township
 Porter Township
 Silver Creek Township
 Volinia Township
 Wayne Township

Unincorporated communities

 Adamsville
 Calvin Center
 Glenwood
 Jones
 La Grange
 Penn
 Pokagon
 Sumnerville
 Union
 Wakelee

Indian reservation
 Cass County contains a large reservation of the Pokagon Band of Potawatomi Indians, which also contains territories in Allegan, Berrien, and Van Buren counties, as well as extending south into the state of Indiana.  The reservation headquarters are located in the county in the city of Dowagiac and also extends into the townships of Pokagon, LaGrange, Silver Creek, Volinia, and Wayne.

See also

 List of Michigan State Historic Sites in Cass County, Michigan
 National Register of Historic Places listings in Cass County, Michigan

References

Further reading

External links
 Cass County government

 
Michigan counties
South Bend – Mishawaka metropolitan area
Populated places on the Underground Railroad
1829 establishments in Michigan Territory
Populated places established in 1829